Eli Raphael Roth (born April 18, 1972) is an American film director, screenwriter, producer, and actor. As a director and producer, he is most closely associated with the horror genre, namely splatter films, having directed the films Cabin Fever (2003) and Hostel (2005).

Roth continued to work in the horror genre, directing the films Hostel: Part II (2007) and The Green Inferno (2013). He also expanded into other genres, directing the erotic thriller film Knock Knock (2015) and the action film Death Wish (2018), a remake of the 1974 original. Also in 2018, he directed the fantasy comedy film The House with a Clock in Its Walls, his first PG-rated film and his highest domestic grosser to date.

As an actor, Roth starred as Donny "The Bear Jew" Donowitz in Quentin Tarantino's war film Inglourious Basterds (2009), for which he received a Critic's Choice Movie Award and an SAG Award as part of the ensemble.

Many journalists have included him in a group of filmmakers dubbed the Splat Pack for their explicitly violent and controversially bloody horror films. In 2013, Roth received the Visionary Award for his contributions to horror at the Stanley Film Festival.

Early life
Roth was born the middle of three sons in Newton, Massachusetts, to Sheldon Roth, a psychiatrist/psychoanalyst and clinical professor at Harvard Medical School, and Cora Roth, a painter. He has an older brother, Adam (born May 1970), and a younger brother, Gabriel (born December 1974). Roth was raised Jewish (his family were Jewish emigrants from Austria, Hungary, Russia, and Poland). In addition to English, he speaks French, Italian, and basic Russian.

Roth began shooting films at the age of eight, after watching Ridley Scott's Alien (1979). He and his brothers, Adam and Gabriel, made more than 100 short films before he graduated from Newton South High School and attended film school (the Tisch School of the Arts) at New York University. To fund his films while in college, Roth worked as an online cybersex operator for Penthouse Magazine, posing as a woman, as well as a production assistant on feature films. Roth also ran the office of producer Frederick Zollo, leaving after graduation to devote himself to writing full-time. He collected unemployment and found work on Howard Stern's Private Parts as Stern's assistant, staying at Silvercup Studios in Queens at night working on his scripts while Stern slept.

Actress Camryn Manheim gave Roth one of his first Hollywood jobs, as an extra on The Practice, when he moved to Los Angeles. Roth would stay in Manheim's dressing room, working on his scripts, while she filmed the show. The two had become friends in New York, while Roth was working for Zollo. Roth also met Manheim's cousin Howie Nuchow (former EVP of Mandalay Sports Entertainment and also from the Boston area) at her family Passover seder—this led to Roth's first animation project, Chowdaheads, the following year. Roth also co-wrote a project called The Extra with Manheim, who later sold the pitch to producer (and former CEO and Chairman of Fox Studios) Bill Mechanic's Pandemonium company.

Film career
At NYU film school, Roth wrote and directed a student film called Restaurant Dogs, an homage to Quentin Tarantino's Reservoir Dogs. The film was nominated for a Student Academy Award in 1995, ultimately winning its division (Division III).

Through his internship with Frederick Zollo, Roth met David Lynch and remained in touch over the years, eventually producing content for Lynch with his fledgling website in the late 1990s. Through Lynch, Roth met film and TV composer Angelo Badalamenti, whose music he used in his first feature film. He also met a member of special effects company KNB EFX, which contributed to his first feature.

In 1999, Roth moved to Los Angeles, where he wrote, directed, edited, produced, animated, and provided voices for a series of animated shorts called Chowdaheads for Mandalay Sports Entertainment. They were to be shown between WCW Monday Nitro pro wrestling matches, but they were finished but never actually broadcast. Roth's friend Noah Belson co-wrote the shorts and provided the other character voices.

In mid-2000, with financing from the website Z.com to deliver a five-minute pilot, Roth wrote, directed, animated, and produced a series of stop-motion shorts called The Rotten Fruit. The company folded after several episodes were done, and its domain name was picked up by Nissan for its "Z" sports car. A portion of Roth's work for The Rotten Fruit was done at the Snake Pit studios in Burbank with miniature sets, posable clay, foam figures, two high-end digital still cameras, and a pair of Macintosh computers. Noah Belson co-wrote and performed character voices.

Cabin Fever
Roth had co-written Cabin Fever with his college roommate Randy Pearlstein. They based the premise on Roth's experience of contracting a skin infection while riding ponies at a family friend's farm in Iceland in 1991. Much of it was written in 1996, while Roth worked as a production assistant for Howard Stern's film Private Parts.

Cabin Fever was produced in 2001 on a budget of $1.5 million raised from private investors. The film was sold to Lionsgate at the 2002 Toronto International Film Festival for $3.5 million, the biggest sale of that year's festival. Released in 2003, it was Lionsgate's highest-grossing film of the year, earning $22 million at the U.S. box office and $35 million worldwide. Lionsgate's stock rose from $1.98 a share to nearly $6 a share after the film was released; the company used its newly valuable stock to buy Artisan Entertainment. Cabin Fever made Roth a star in the horror genre. In a 2004 Premiere Magazine interview, Quentin Tarantino called it "the best new American film". Cabin Fever was remade in 2016 and directed by Travis Zariwny.

Hostel
In 2005, Roth's second feature, Hostel, was made for just over $4 million. It opened No. 1 at the box office in January 2006, taking in $20 million its first weekend. The film went on to gross $80 million worldwide in box office, and more than $180 million on DVD. Although the story is set in Slovakia, all the exteriors were shot in the Czech Republic.

In the film, three friends are lured to visit a hostel where they think their sexual fantasies will come true. Instead, they fall into the clutches of an international syndicate that provides first-hand torture and killing experiences for rich, sadistic tourists. The film was rated No. 1 on Bravo TV's 30 Even Scarier Movie Moments, and Empire Magazine readers voted Hostel the Best Horror Film of 2007.

Roth reportedly turned down studio directing jobs to make Hostel. He took a directing salary of only $10,000 to keep the budget as low as possible, so there would be no limits set on its violence. In January 2006, film critic David Edelstein in New York magazine credited Roth with creating the horror subgenre "torture porn", or "gorno", using excessive violence to excite audiences like a sexual act.

Thanksgiving
In 2007, Roth directed and narrated the faux trailer segment Thanksgiving for Grindhouse and appeared in Death Proof, Tarantino's segment of the film. Roth and co-writer Jeff Rendell won a 2007 Spike TV Scream Award for best "screamplay" for their work in Grindhouse, sharing the honor with Tarantino, Robert Rodriguez, Rob Zombie, and Edgar Wright.

In January 2023, it was announced Roth is developing a feature-length film version of Thanksgiving.

Hostel: Part II

Hostel: Part II opened in sixth place in June 2007, with $8.2 million; it went on to gross $17.6 million in US theaters. The film, which cost $10.2 million, earned $35 million in theaters worldwide and $50 million on DVD and pay television.

Lionsgate attributed the lower grosses to the summer release, opposite blockbusters such as Shrek the Third, Pirates of the Caribbean: At World's End, and Ocean's Thirteen, as well as the film's workprint having been leaked online before its release. Close to two million illegal workprint downloads were tracked the day Hostel 2 opened.

Hostel: Part II was nominated for six Spike TV Scream Awards, including best horror film and best director. It was on Entertainment Weekly'''s list of the 20 best horror films of the past 20 years.

Endangered Species
In 2009, while acting in Inglourious Basterds, Roth said that he would soon begin his next film, Endangered Species.

In a 2013 interview with The Guardian, Roth indicated that he had suspended work on Endangered Species to focus on 2013's The Green Inferno.

The Green Inferno
Roth directed the cannibal horror film The Green Inferno (2013), which was inspired by his love of Mondo horror films such as the infamous Cannibal Holocaust. The Green Inferno was criticized for its portrayal of indigenous people as cannibals, and it was described as a "new low in racist film making" by People's World.Death Wish
Roth's 2018 remake of the film Death Wish opened to $13 million at the box office. The film is centered around a trauma surgeon who turns to vigilantism after his family is attacked. The film was panned by critics as "pro-gun propaganda" and ill-timed in the wake of the Stoneman Douglas High School shooting. Roth defended the film, stating that the film was not pro-gun and that he wanted the film to focus on family, protecting one's family, and seeking justice for one's family.

Other projects

 Film 
In 2002, Roth brought a shot-for-shot remake of Raiders of the Lost Ark made by children to the attention of both Harry Knowles and Steven Spielberg. He had a copy in his video collection for years, and showed it at Knowles's Butt-Numb-A-Thon film festival in December. The response was so great that Roth took the tape to his first meeting at DreamWorks to give to Spielberg. An executive called the next week saying that Spielberg loved it and wanted to contact the filmmakers. Roth had never met them, but Google-searched every name in the credits until he found Jayson Lamb, the cinematographer. The three filmmakers—Lamb, Chris Strompolis, and Eric Zala (a former Activision employee)—had not spoken to each other in years when Roth contacted them. Roth, feeling that their film was so powerful he had to do whatever he could to make sure fans saw it, introduced it at its premiere at Grauman's Chinese Theatre in May 2008, five and a half years after he first gave the tape to Knowles. Soon, the three reunited friends were touring the world, doing charity screenings.

In March 2006, Dimension Films bought the rights to Cell by Stephen King and would produce a film to be directed by Roth. In 2009, King finished the screenplay, and actors John Cusack and Samuel L. Jackson joined the project; however, Roth did not direct.

Through his company, Arcade, with Eric Newman and Strike producer Marc Abraham, Roth produced the horror film The Last Exorcism, (originally titled Cotton) which was directed by Daniel Stamm. Completed in December 2009 and retitled in February 2010, The Last Exorcism cost $1.5 million to produce. It opened at more than $20 million in U.S. sales, and earned No. #1 opening spots in Canada and the UK. The film had paid for itself when rights in a few foreign territories were sold before shooting began. It earned over $40 million box office in the United States, and $70 million worldwide.

Roth has talked of doing Trailer Trash, another compilation of fake trailers. "Trailer Trash is not a horror film," he said; "it's a comedy. It will be very R-rated and completely insane, and I'm producing it with Mike Fleiss".

He has also produced the 2012 kung fu film The Man with the Iron Fists, written, directed, and scored by RZA who also stars in the film. According to Roth, Tarantino is involved as well. In an interview with CHUD, Roth said:

In 2014, Roth produced the American supernatural horror film Clown and had the minor role of "Frowny the Clown." He next helmed Knock Knock (2015), a remake of the 1977 horror-thriller Death Game, about two young women who seduce a married man and then do unspeakable things to him. Keanu Reeves starred and executive produced.

In 2015, Roth was announced as the director of the adaptation of the best-selling shark novel Meg: A Novel of Deep Terror, eventually called The Meg. In 2016, it was announced that he had left the project due to creative differences.

In 2020, it was announced that Roth would direct an adaptation of the Borderlands games, with Craig Mazin penning the screenplay with Roth.

 Film commentary 
Roth recorded an audio commentary for Troma's 1997 DVD release of Blood Sucking Freaks four years before directing his first film, billed as a "Blood and Guts Expert". The DVD is one of Troma's highest-selling.

Roth is a frequent contributor to DVD "extras" content (liner notes, video commentary) for horror film distributors Grindhouse Releasing/Box Office Spectaculars, particularly for two of his favorite films Juan Piquer Simón's Pieces and the North American DVD release of Lucio Fulci's Cat in the Brain.DVD Trash: DVD Release: Cat in the Brain. Dvdtrash.blogspot.com. Retrieved on September 8, 2011.

Acting
Roth began his professional acting career in 1998 and has been known to play parts in the films he produces. Roth's most notable appearance to date is his role as violent Bostonian soldier Donny "The Bear Jew" Donowitz in the 2009 Quentin Tarantino film Inglourious Basterds.Roth's role in Quentin Tarantino's segment of the 2007 film Grindhouse, Death Proof, came about because Tarantino was impressed by Roth's brief part as Justin in Cabin Fever. Roth—who left pre-production on Hostel: Part II in Prague and flew to Austin, Texas, to film the scene at the Texas Chili Parlor—said that working as an actor for Tarantino is "like taking a master class in directing". He quipped that the only directors he would ever act for are people who have won the Palme d'Or at the Cannes Film Festival.

Outside of these films and his own, Roth has appeared in a cameo role as a contest emcee in Alexandre Aja's 2010 film Piranha 3D and in the 2012 musical film Rock of Ages, among others. Roth has also appeared in several projects that David Lynch directed for his website davidlynch.com.

Work in television
Roth hosted and executive-produced an episode of Discovery Channel's TV series Curiosity, titled "How Evil Are You?". The episode explored the scientific aspects of evil, with Roth undergoing a brain scan and DNA sequencing at University of California, Davis with neuropsychiatrist Dr. James Fallon. Roth also re-created the infamous Milgram experiments for the documentary, with results identical to those from 50 years earlier.

Roth directed the pilot of Hemlock Grove, a horror/thriller series, that premiered on Netflix on April 19, 2013.

He also hosts Shark After Dark on Discovery Channel's Shark Week.

Other ventures
In 2009, Roth wrote, directed, and acted in a PSA for People for the Ethical Treatment of Animals (PETA) about the link between violence against animals and violence against people. Roth won a Telly Award for his spot (Public Service Category: Bronze).

Roth is a curator of the Museum of Pop Culture's exhibit "Can't Look Away", detailing the history of horror. He was selected, along with directors John Landis and Roger Corman, to represent three generations of film directors who have shaped the genre. The installation opened in September 2011 and ran through 2014.

In September 2012, he opened a haunted house, Eli Roth's Goretorium, in Las Vegas. Haunted Desert LLC, which owns Goretorium, filed for bankruptcy protection in July 2013, and the attraction closed in October.

Roth directed the music video for Snoop Lion's lead single "La La La" from his reggae-genre album Reincarnated, which was released on April 23, 2013.

In 2015, Roth partnered with Jack Davis to launch Crypt TV, a digital company focused on short-form horror content.

In 2021, Roth invested in Jomboy Media, a digital media company that produces content focused on sports and pop culture.

PublicityMen's Fitness magazine voted Roth "Most Fit Director" in their July 2006 issue, a title Roth takes very seriously. He follows a strict workout routine, which he documents on the Hostel DVDs. Roth claims that he treats every red carpet like a Milan runway, and he often jokes that he makes films only as a way to live out his lifelong dream of being a male supermodel. He spoke of his love for fashion in his interview in the October 2007 issue of Italian Vogue.

Roth was profiled on the G4 TV show Icons and was on the cover of Forbes'' magazine's "Hollywood's Most Profitable Stars" issue.

Personal life
Roth married Chilean actress and model Lorenza Izzo in November 2014, on the beach of the Chilean town Zapallar. The couple announced their separation in July 2018. Their divorce was finalized in August 2019.

Filmography

Film

Television

Acting roles

Video Games

References

External links
 
 

1972 births
Living people
Artists from Newton, Massachusetts
Male actors from Massachusetts
American male film actors
American people of Austrian-Jewish descent
American people of Hungarian-Jewish descent
American people of Polish-Jewish descent
American people of Russian-Jewish descent
Horror film directors
Jewish American male actors
Jewish American writers
Tisch School of the Arts alumni
Outstanding Performance by a Cast in a Motion Picture Screen Actors Guild Award winners
21st-century American male actors
American expatriates in Chile
Actors from Newton, Massachusetts
Film directors from Massachusetts
Newton South High School alumni
Film producers from Massachusetts
Screenwriters from Massachusetts
American film directors
American film producers
American male screenwriters